The Son is a five-act Expressionist play by the German playwright Walter Hasenclever. It was the first self-proclaimed, full-length Expressionist play to be produced, though its dramatic structure is more or less realistic. It takes as its subject the conflict between the generations and a rejection of the world in general by the young. It is a semi-autobiographical work.

It was written in 1912, first published in 1914, and first performed in 1916 at the Albert-Theater in Dresden, although Hasenclever had read the play at the literary cabaret Das Gnu in early 1914. Ernst Deutsch played the Son to great acclaim.

The play ends with the Son killing his father. He then "strides triumphantly over his father's corpse into a future full of glorious potential".

References

Sources

 Banham, Martin, ed. 1998. The Cambridge Guide to Theatre. Cambridge: Cambridge University Press. .
 Hasenclever, Walter. 1994. Der Sohn. Ein Drama in fünf Akten. Nachw. v. Michael Schulz. Stuttgart: Reclam. .
 Kuhns, David F. 1997. German Expressionist Theatre: The Actor and the Stage. New ed. Cambridge: Cambridge UP, 2006. .
 Marx, Henry, trans. 1997. The Son. By Walter Hasenclever. In Schürer (1997a, 82-145).
 Rorrison, Hugh. 1998. "Hasenclever, Walter." In Banham (1998, 475).
 Schürer, Ernst, ed. 1997a. German Expressionist Plays. The German Library ser. vol. 66. New York: Continuum. . 
 ---. 1997b. Introduction. In Schürer (1997a, vii-xxi).
 Wellwarth, George E. 2002. "Expressionism." In The Reader's Encyclopedia of World Drama. Ed. John Gassner and Edward Quinn. Mineola, NY: Dover. 256-261. .

1914 plays
1916 plays
Expressionist plays
German plays